Vichy is an unincorporated community in southern Maries County, Missouri, United States. It is located on U.S. Route 63, approximately ten miles north of Rolla. The community was founded in 1880 and is named after Vichy, France. A post office called Vichy has been in operation since 1880. The Rolla National Airport, a former U.S. Army airfield owned and operated by the City of Rolla, with two  asphalt runways, is located nearby.  The ZIP Code for Vichy is 65580.

Climate

According to the Köppen Climate Classification system, Vichy has a humid subtropical climate, abbreviated "Cfa" on climate maps.

References

Unincorporated communities in Maries County, Missouri
Unincorporated communities in Missouri